Ximena Lamadrid (born 5 June 1996 in Cancún, México) is a Mexican actress. She is best known for her role in the Mexican crime-drama Netflix show Who Killed Sara?, in which she portrays Sara Guzmán.

Biography 
Lamadrid grew up in Dubai. At the age of nineteen, she moved to the United States to pursue a degree in theater at the New York University Tisch School of the Arts, where she studied for two years.

Filmography 

 Truth or Consequences (2017 short) as Lily
Las Lobitas, Los Angeles (2019 short) as Angel Jean
Mud and Honey (2019 short) as Delilah
On the Rocks (2020) as Mandy
 Who Killed Sara? (2021 TV series) as Sara Guzmán
Dance Dance Dance (short) as Ava
Bardo, False Chronicle of a Handful of Truths (film) as Camila Gama
''Break'' (2019 short) as June Tyler

References 

21st-century Mexican actresses
New York University alumni
Tisch School of the Arts alumni
Living people
1996 births
People from Cancún
Mexican film actresses
Mexican television actresses